is a song recorded by Japanese singer Misia, from the album Love Bebop. It was released as the album's second single digitally on February 11, 2015, through Ariola Japan. It was released as a limited double A-side CD single alongside the song "Shiroi Kisetsu" a week later, on February 18, 2015. The song was written by Misia, composed by her0ism and Shirose, from the band White Jam, and arranged and produced by her0ism. It was written specifically for the three-night TX drama The Eternal Zero, adapted from the film by the same name and starring Osamu Mukai, for which it serves as theme song.

Background and release
"Sakura Hitohira" was promoted as being Misia's first Sakura song, a longstanding thematic in Japanese music. On January 22, a trailer for the single was uploaded on Misia's official YouTube channel. The single features three B-sides: the Shiro Sagisu-produced "Mayonaka no Hide-and-seek", "Candle of Life", which Misia first performed during the 2014 installment of her Misia Candle Night concert series, and lastly a remix of the latter track. The CD single cover artwork was designed by longtime collaborator Mitsuo Shindō and photographed by Kristian Schmidt.

Composition
"Sakura Hitohira" is written in the key of F-sharp minor with a common time tempo of 82 beats per minute. Misia's vocals span from A3 to C5.

Chart performance
"Sakura Hitohira" debuted at number 9 on the weekly RecoChoku Singles chart. The CD single made its debut at number 24 on the Oricon Singles Chart, with 4,000 copies sold in its first charting week. It charted for nine consecutive weeks and sold a reported total of 9,000 copies.

Track listing

Credits and personnel
Personnel

 Vocals, backing vocals – Misia
 Songwriting – Misia, her0ism, Shirose
 Arrangement, programming, all other instruments – her0ism
 Electronic keyboard – Chris Rob
 Drums – Lil' John Roberts
 Bass – Nathan Watts
 Guitar – Errol Cooney
 Acoustic guitar – Taichi Nakamura
 Mixing – Tony Maserati
 Engineering – Masahiro Kawaguchi, Raheem Amlani
 Mastering – Herb Powers Jr.

Charts

References

2015 singles
2015 songs
Misia songs
Songs written by Misia
Japanese television drama theme songs
Song recordings produced by her0ism
Ariola Japan singles
Songs written by Her0ism